The Spy is a 2012 Russian spy film, an adaptation of Boris Akunin's novel The Spy Novel (Шпионский роман). It was directed by Alexey Andrianov, the film stars Danila Kozlovsky and Fyodor Bondarchuk. Akunin adapted his own novel. It had one of the largest film budgets in Russian history.

Plot
The movie is set in the year 1941, months before the German invasion of Russia. The two protagonists, NKVD officers Dorin and Oktyabrsky, are hunting a German Abwehr spy in Moscow. They believe their success might reveal Hitler's plans and the exact date of invasion.

It is implied that Dorin is a distant relative of Erast Fandorin, the most popular character of Akunin's books.

Cast
 Danila Kozlovsky as Yegor Dorin, State Security Officer
 Fyodor Bondarchuk as Alexey Oktyabrsky, Senior Major of State Security, Head of Dorin
 Anna Chipovskaya as Nadezhda 'Nadya'
 Viktoriya Tolstoganova as Iraida Petrakovich
 Sergey Gazarov as People's Commissar
 Vladimir Epifantsev as senior security lieutenant Kogan
 Andrey Merzlikin as radio operator Karpenko
 Viktor Verzhbitsky as Lezhava, a member of the NKVD
 Ekaterina Melnik as Lyubov Serova
 Dmitry Nazarov as Nadya's dad
 Mikhail Filippov as Leader
 Oleksiy Gorbunov as Selentsov, Vasser's Connector
 Boris Kamorzin as Lyalin, chauffeur of the NKVD
 Alexander Kuznetsov as NKVD officer
 Eckie Hoffman as Adolf Hitler
 Edgar Bölke as Admiral Wilhelm Canaris
 Felix Schultess as driver of Admiral Wilhelm Canaris
 Maksim Maltsev as Golovasty

Crew
 Director - Alexey Andrianov
 Producer - Leonid Vereshchagin, Sergey Shumakov
 Screenplay by Vladimir Valutskiy
 Production designer - Viktor Petrov
 Cinematographer - Denis Alarcon-Ramirez
 Stunt Coordinator - Valeriy Derkach
 Editor (TV version) - Luca Paracels

Production
The film was based on the plot of Boris Akunin's The Spy Novel written in 2005.
In the tango scene, during a pause, the hero of Fyodor Bondarchuk clicks his orchestra loudly with his fingers. Although the hand is in a glove, and it is impossible to make such a sound in it.

Filming
Principal photography, some scenes had to be shot not in the Russian capital, but in the city of Minsk, Belarus.

Versions
The duration of the full television version is more than 4 series of 45 minutes.

Release 
The film was released in the Russian Federation on April 5, 2012, by Central Partnership. The closed premiere took place on April 2.

Reception
The movie was a moderate success at the box office grossing $4.588.176 (258.479.483 rubles) against a budget of 192.000.000 rubles.

Critical response
From an article about the film The Spy in the journal Izvestia:
The Russian film The Spy, sold in the USA for display on the VOD system (video on demand), in just a few days at the HULU video service, came out in number of views to 14th place among 2.5 thousand European, American and Asian films. This is an extraordinary result, commented on the information of Eleanor Pomegranate, representing Loskino in Los Angeles.

From the review of the film The Spy in the newspaper Gazeta.Ru:
The Spy is the first successful adaptation of Boris Akunin's prose, placed in the only comic book space suitable for her.

From the review of the film The Spy in the newspaper Trud:
Alexei Andrianov's fantasy turned out to be ironic, rich, full of chic and funny episodes. Where, for example, there is a wonderful Oktyabrsky tango with a movie star Lyubov Serova (Ekaterina Melnik) who was beaten off by him in a restaurant for unsympathetic youths - and in this scene the exquisitely self-righteous hero Bondarchuk evokes about the same feelings as the imperial Moscow invented by Andrianov.

References

External links
 
 
 
 The Spy at Eurochannel

Films based on works by Boris Akunin
2012 films
2010s Russian-language films
2010s spy action films
2010s spy thriller films
Dieselpunk films
Russian spy action films
World War II spy films
2012 action thriller films
2010s action adventure films
Films set in 1941
Films set in the Soviet Union
Films scored by Yuri Poteyenko
Russian action war films
Russian action thriller films
Russian action adventure films
Russian historical action films
Cultural depictions of Adolf Hitler
2010s historical films
Russian historical adventure films
Films shot in Belarus
Russian World War II films